Carradine is a surname. Notable people with the surname include:

People

The Carradine acting family, including:
John Carradine, American actor
David Carradine, American actor, son of John Carradine
Robert Carradine, American actor, son of John Carradine
Ever Carradine, American actress, daughter of Robert Carradine
Keith Carradine, American actor and songwriter, son of John Carradine
Sorel Carradine, American actress, daughter of Keith Carradine
Sandra Will Carradine, American actress, first wife of Keith Carradine

 Beverly Carradine (1848–1931), American Methodist minister and evangelist; grandfather of actor John Carradine

Cat Iron ( – ), real name William Carradine, African-American blues singer and guitarist
Tank Carradine (born 1990), American football player

Fictional characters
Carradine, the burglar who killed Spider-Man's Uncle Ben. (Known as Dennis Carradine, a.k.a. Carjacker or Spike, in the movie continuity.)
Jessica Carradine, his daughter in the comics